The DBL Play-offs MVP is an annual Dutch Basketball League award given since to the league's most valuable player in the Playoffs of a given DBL season. The award was handed out for the first time in the 2004–05 season, but after then the award disappeared. In the 2013–14 season, the award would be handed out again.

Winners

Awards by player

Awards by nationality

References

Dutch Basketball League awards